Çömlek cheese is a typical artisanal cheese from Central Anatolia, meaning "pot cheese."

See also
 Pot cheese

References
 

Turkish cuisine
Turkish cheeses